Bou Ismaïl District is a district of Tipaza Province, Algeria.

Districts of Tipaza Province